The 1923 Texas Longhorns football team represented the University of Texas at Austin in the 1923 college football season.  In their first year under head coach E. J. Stewart, the Longhorns compiled an 8–0–1 record, shut out seven of nine opponents, and outscored all opponents by a collective total of 241 to 21.

Texas upset a powerful Vanderbilt squad 16 to 0 at the State Fair. The highlight of the game was a run by Oscar Eckhardt, running over multiple Vanderbilt tacklers and regaining his balance with a hand on the ground at the 8-yard line.

Schedule

References

Texas
Texas Longhorns football seasons
College football undefeated seasons
Texas Longhorns football